Kirsten Carthew is a Canadian film director, producer and screenwriter from Yellowknife, Northwest Territories.

Carthew made a number of short films, most notably Fish Out of Water in 2015, before releasing her debut feature film, The Sun at Midnight, in 2016. Her second feature film, Polaris, went into production in 2021, and was released in 2022.

References

External links

21st-century Canadian screenwriters
21st-century Canadian women writers
Canadian women film directors
Canadian women screenwriters
Canadian women film producers
Film directors from the Northwest Territories
Writers from Yellowknife
Living people
Year of birth missing (living people)